One (Onele, Aunalei) is a Torricelli dialect cluster of West Wapei Rural LLG in Sandaun Province, Papua New Guinea.

Languages
Glottolog 4.0 lists the following One varieties as separate languages:
Southern One
Kwamtim One
Central-Northern One
Inebu
Kabore
Molmo
Northern One

A detailed dialectology of One is described in Crowther (2001).

The One dialects are spoken in the following villages and wards of West Wapei Rural LLG, Sandaun Province.
Kwamtim One is spoken in Kwamtum and Kwatim villages.
Inebu One is spoken in Inebu ward.
Kabore One is spoken in Kabore ward.
Molmo One is spoken in Molmo ward.

Phonology
Molmo One consonants are:
{| 
| m || n || 
|-
| p || t || k
|-
| f || s || 
|-
| w || l || j
|-
|  || r || 
|}

Molmo One vowels are:
{| 
| i || ɨ || u
|-
| e ||  || o
|-
| ɛ || a || ɔ
|}

Pronouns
Molmo One pronouns:

{| 
!  !! sg !! du !! pl
|-
! 1incl
|  || mimpla ~ fimpla || mine
|-
! 1excl
| i || mumpla ~ fumpla || mo
|-
! 2
| (y)ine ~ yo || pimpla || pine ~ po
|-
! 3
| wine ~ wo || numpla || nine ~ no
|}

Nouns
Molmo One nominal plural formatives include:

{| 
! gloss !! singular !! plural
|-
| ‘woman’ || pino || pini
|-
| ‘wife’ || puli || pulpi
|-
| ‘flower’ || sula || sulu
|-
| ‘lizard’ || saunina || saune
|-
| ‘mosquito’ || unkun || unkle
|-
| ‘thorn’ || neni || nenine
|}

Further reading
Donohue, Mark P. n.d. Lexical categories, complexity and the configurationality split in One. Unpublished manuscript, Department of Linguistics, Monash University.

References

One languages
Languages of Sandaun Province